The Permian Basin Regional Planning Commission (PBRPC) is a voluntary association of cities, counties and special districts in the Permian Basin region of West Texas.

Based in Midland, the Permian Basin Regional Planning Commission is a member of the Texas Association of Regional Councils.

Counties served
Andrews
Borden
Chaves
Crane
Dawson
Ector
Eddy
El Paso
Gaines
Glasscock
Howard
Lea
Loving
Martin
Midland
Pecos
Reeves
Taylor
Terrell
Upton
Ward
Winkler

Largest cities in the region
 El Paso
 Lubbock
 Midland
 Abilene
 Odessa
 Las Cruces
 San Angelo
 Roswell
 Hobbs
 Del Rio
 Socorro
 Alamogordo
 Carlsbad
 Big Spring
 Plainview
 Horizon City
 Andrews
 Portales
 Artesia
 Lovington
 Pecos
 Big Lake

References

External links
Permian Basin Regional Planning Commission - Official site.

Texas Association of Regional Councils